Folau is a Tongan surname.
Israel Folau (born 1989), Australian professional rugby footballer
Maria Folau (nee Tuta'ia ) (born 1987) wife of Israel Folau
Spencer Folau (born 1973), Tongan American football player
Tevita Folau (born 1985), Australian professional rugby league footballer
Mylee Folau (born 1995), American Economist
Folau Fainga'a (born 1995), Australian rugby union player

Tongan-language surnames